Lebia calliope is a species of beetle in the family Carabidae. It is found in Guatemala, Mexico and the U.S. state of Texas.

References

Further reading

 
 
 
 
 

Lebia
Beetles described in 1883
Taxa named by Henry Walter Bates